Charming Sinners is a 1929 American pre-Code comedy film directed by Robert Milton and Dorothy Arzner (who was uncredited), with a screenplay by Doris Anderson adapted from the 1926 play The Constant Wife written by W. Somerset Maugham. The film stars Ruth Chatterton, Clive Brook, Mary Nolan, William Powell, Laura Hope Crews and Florence Eldridge. The film was released on August 17, 1929, by Paramount Pictures.

It has been described as a "splendid example of the early talkie period" with use of static camera and dialogue-heavy scenes.

Plot
In London, aware of her husband's longstanding affair and feeling neglected, Kathryn Miles flirts with a former flame in a plot to teach her husband a lesson without endangering their marriage.

Cast
Ruth Chatterton as Kathryn Miles
Clive Brook as Robert Miles
Mary Nolan as Anne-Marie Whitley
William Powell as Karl Kraley
Laura Hope Crews as Mrs. Carr
Florence Eldridge as Helen Carr
Montagu Love as George Whitley
Juliette Crosby as Margaret
Lorraine MacLean as Alice
Claud Allister as Gregson

References

Bibliography
 Bryant, Roger. William Powell: The Life and Films. McFarland, 2014.
 Mayne, Judith. Directed by Dorothy Arzner. Indiana University Press, 1995

External links
 

1929 films
American comedy films
1929 comedy films
Paramount Pictures films
American black-and-white films
Films directed by Dorothy Arzner
Films set in London
American films based on plays
Films based on works by W. Somerset Maugham
1929 drama films
Films scored by Karl Hajos
1920s English-language films
1920s American films